Tromsø University Museum (Norges arktiske universitetsmuseum) is the oldest scientific institution in Northern Norway.  The museum has 80,000-90,000 visitors annually.

History

It was established in 1872 and incorporated in the University of Tromsø in 1976.
As of 2012, the museum comprises two scientific sections:  natural sciences and cultural sciences. Each section has large collections documenting more than 100 years of exploration of the region and other northern areas. The permanent exhibitions at the museum include geology and zoology as well as two Sámi exhibitions.

The University Museum has four departments that are open to the public: Tromsø Museum on the south of the island, Polar Museum (Polarmuseet) in Tromsø city center, M/S Polstjerna at  the south of town  and the Arctic-Alpine Botanical Garden (Tromsø arktisk-alpine botaniske)  at  Breivika.

Sámi Ethnography 
The museum publish the popular science magazine Ottar (Norwegian only) and an English language publication called Way North.

See also 
 Arctic-alpine botanic garden

References

External links 
  NAU Official homepage
 Tromsø Museum's online photo archive
 Editions of the science magazine Way North

Museums established in 1872
Natural history museums in Norway
Buildings and structures in Tromsø
Museums in Troms og Finnmark
University museums in Norway